Justo Rolando Bacigalupo Madueño (14 August 1914 – 12 October 1989) was a Peruvian basketball player. He competed in the 1936 Summer Olympics.

References

External links

1914 births
1989 deaths
Peruvian men's basketball players
Olympic basketball players of Peru
Basketball players at the 1936 Summer Olympics
Sportspeople from Lima
20th-century Peruvian people